Sequential linear-quadratic programming (SLQP) is an iterative method for nonlinear optimization problems where objective function and constraints are twice continuously differentiable. Similarly to sequential quadratic programming (SQP), SLQP proceeds by solving a sequence of optimization subproblems. The difference between the two approaches is that:

 in SQP, each subproblem is a quadratic program, with a quadratic model of the objective subject to a linearization of the constraints
 in SLQP, two subproblems are solved at each step: a linear program (LP) used to determine an active set, followed by an equality-constrained quadratic program (EQP) used to compute the total step

This decomposition makes SLQP suitable to large-scale optimization problems, for which efficient LP and EQP solvers are available, these problems being easier to scale than full-fledged quadratic programs.

Algorithm basics
Consider a nonlinear programming problem of the form:

The Lagrangian for this problem is

LP phase 

In the LP phase of SLQP, the following linear program is solved:

EQP phase 

In the EQP phase of SLQP, the search direction  of the step is obtained by solving the following equality-constrained quadratic program:

Note that the term  in the objective functions above may be left out for the minimization problems, since it is constant.

See also
 Newton's method
 Secant method
 Sequential linear programming
 Sequential quadratic programming

Notes

References
 

Optimization algorithms and methods